Qasem Zamel (also Romanized as Qāsem Zāmel) is a village in Karkheh Rural District, Hamidiyeh District, Ahvaz County, Khuzestan Province, Iran. At the 2006 census, its population was 387, in 40 families.

References 

Populated places in Ahvaz County